The 2022–23 Northwestern Wildcats men's basketball team represents Northwestern University in the 2022–23 NCAA Division I men's basketball season. They are led by 10th-year head coach Chris Collins. The Wildcats play their home games at Welsh–Ryan Arena in Evanston, Illinois as members of the Big Ten Conference. The Wildcats finished in a tie for 2nd place in the Big Ten, their highest finish since the 1958-59 season.

Previous season
The Wildcats finished the 2021–22 season 15–16, 7–13 in Big Ten play to finish in a three-way tie for 10th place. As the No. 12 seed in the Big Ten tournament, they defeated Nebraska in the first round before losing to Iowa in the second round.

Offseason

Departures

Incoming transfers

Recruiting classes

2022 recruiting class

2023 recruiting class

Roster

Schedule and results
In the team's December 4, 2022 2022–23 Big Ten Conference men's basketball season opener against 20th-ranked Michigan State, Northwestern won on the road as 5.5 point underdogs. They defeated 15th-ranked Indiana on the road as 6 point underdogs on January 8, 2023. The Wildcats originally scheduled game against Iowa on January 18, 2023 was postponed due to COVID-19 protocols within the Northwestern program. The game was rescheduled for January 31. The next game against Wisconsin on January 21 was also postponed due to COVID-19 protocols at Northwestern. On February 11 Northwestern defeated Purdue, earning its first ever victory over an AP Poll number one ranked team. In the subsequent game on February 15, Northwestern established a school record with its fourth victory of the season over a ranked opponent by defeating 14th-ranked Indiana in a rematch. The victory also marked the first time the Wildcats had defeated ranked opponents in back-to-back games since the 2008–09 Northwestern Wildcats did so in January of 2009.

|-
!colspan=9 style=|Exhibition

|-
!colspan=9 style=|Regular season

|-
!colspan=9 style=|Big Ten tournament

|-
!colspan=12 style=| NCAA Tournament

Source

Rankings

*''AP does not release post-NCAA Tournament rankings.

References

Northwestern Wildcats
Northwestern Wildcats men's basketball seasons
Northwestern Wild
Northwestern